Murex carbonnieri, also known as Carbonnier's murex,  is a species of large predatory sea snail, a marine gastropod mollusc in the family Muricidae, the rock snails or murex snails.

Distribution
This species occurs in the Red Sea.

References

External links
 Jousseaume, F. (1881). Diagnoses de mollusques nouveaux. Le Naturaliste. 3(44): 349-350
 A.H. (1950). New marine mollusks from Dominica, B. W. I. The Nautilus. 63: 126-128, pls 9-10

Murex